Pick Up Heaven is the debut album of Drain, released in March 1992 through Trance Syndicate. The vocals on "Martyr's Road" were taken from an Islamic chant record that was in Coffey's possession.

Track listing

Personnel 
Drain
King Coffey – drums, keyboards, vocals
David McCreath – guitar, vocals
Owen McMahon – bass guitar, vocals
Production and additional personnel
Ben Blank – engineering, mixing, recording
Drain – production
Butch Vig – recording on "Crawfish" and "Instant Hippie"

References

External links 
 

1992 debut albums
Drain (band) albums
Trance Syndicate albums